Zoo zéro is a 1979 French film directed by Alain Fleischer and starring Klaus Kinski.

Cast
 Catherine Jourdan - Eva 
 Klaus Kinski - Yavé
 Pierre Clémenti - Ivo
 Lisette Malidor - Ivy
 Rufus - Yves
 Piéral - Uwe
 Alida Valli - Yvonne
 Christine Chappey - Yvette
 Anthony Steffen - Evariste
 Jacky Belhassen - Yvon
 Fabien Belhassen - Yvan

References

External links

1979 films
French science fiction drama films
1970s French-language films
1970s French films